In differential geometry, a projective connection is a type of Cartan connection on a differentiable manifold. 

The structure of a projective connection is modeled on the geometry of projective space, rather than the affine space corresponding to an affine connection. Much like affine connections, projective connections also define geodesics. However, these geodesics are not affinely parametrized. Rather they are projectively parametrized, meaning that their preferred class of parameterizations is acted upon by the group of fractional linear transformations.

Like an affine connection, projective connections have associated torsion and curvature.

Projective space as the model geometry

The first step in defining any Cartan connection is to consider the flat case: in which the connection corresponds to the Maurer-Cartan form on a homogeneous space.

In the projective setting, the underlying manifold  of the homogeneous space is the projective space RPn which we shall represent by homogeneous coordinates . Let H be the isotropy group of the point . Thus, M = G/H presents  as a homogeneous space.

Let  be the Lie algebra of G, and  that of H. Note that . As matrices relative to the homogeneous basis,  consists of trace-free  matrices:

.

Relative to the matrix representation above, the Maurer-Cartan form of G is a system of 1-forms  satisfying the structural equations (written using the  Einstein summation convention):

Projective structures on manifolds

A projective structure is a linear geometry on a manifold in which two nearby points are connected by a line (i.e., an unparametrized geodesic) in a unique manner. Furthermore, an infinitesimal neighborhood of each point is equipped with a class of projective frames. According to Cartan (1924), 
Une variété (ou espace) à connexion projective est une variété numérique qui, au voisinage immédiat de chaque point, présente tous les caractères d'un espace projectif et douée de plus d'une loi permettant de raccorder en un seul espace projectif les deux petits morceaux qui entourent deux points infiniment voisins.  ...
Analytiquement, on choisira, d'une manière d'ailleurs arbitraire, dans l'espace projectif attaché à chaque point a de la variété, un repére définissant un système de coordonnées projectives.  ... Le raccord entre les espaces projectifs attachés à deux points infiniment voisins a et a' se traduira analytiquement par une transformation homographique.  ...

This is analogous to Cartan's notion of an affine connection, in which nearby points are thus connected and have an affine frame of reference which is transported from one to the other (Cartan, 1923):
La variété sera dite à "connexion affine" lorsqu'on aura défini, d'une manière d'ailleurs arbitraire, une loi permettant de repérer l'un par rapport à l'autre les espaces affines attachés à deux points infiniment voisins quelconques m et m' de la variété; cete loi permettra de dire que tel point de l'espace affine attaché au point m' correspond à tel point de l'espace affine attaché au point m, que tel vecteur du premier espace es parallèle ou équipollent à tel vecteur du second espace.

In modern language, a projective structure on an n-manifold M is a Cartan geometry modelled on projective space, where the latter is viewed as a homogeneous space for PSL(n+1,R). In other words it is a PSL(n+1,R)-bundle equipped with
 a PSL(n+1,R)-connection (the Cartan connection)
 a reduction of structure group to the stabilizer of a point in projective space
such that the solder form induced by these data is an isomorphism.

Notes

References

 
 
 Hermann, R., Appendix 1-3 in Cartan, E. Geometry of Riemannian Spaces, Math Sci Press, Massachusetts, 1983.

External links

Differential geometry
Connection (mathematics)